Kristian Stensby is a Norwegian-American entrepreneur and businessman involved in the marine and particularly the cruise line industry. Kristian Stensby is the President and Chief Executive Officer of Ocean Group.

Background
Stensby spent 18 months in the Royal Norwegian Air Force (1975–76), before completing Section I of Norwegian Law Studies at the University of Oslo in 1978. In 1980, he earned a bachelor's degree in business administration from the University of Denver, and subsequently completed a foreign student program at San Francisco State University, earning him a Siviløkonom degree from the Norwegian School of Management (Handelshøyskolen BI) in 1982. Stensby first became involved in the cruise industry in an investor/investment banking capacity with a Norwegian investment company owned by Den norske Bank and later with Merrill Lynch.

Career
In 1990, Stensby  became the founder of Premier Cruises and acted as Chairman and CEO up until 1997. Stensby also served as Treasurer of Kloster Cruise Limited (KCL), the parent company of Norwegian Cruise Line, Royal Viking Line, and Royal Cruise Line.

In 2002, Stensby was the founding partner of Ocean Group and has been involved in development projects within the passenger ship industry both on behalf of Ocean Group and related entities.
Stensby was also the founder and promoter of the Ocean Residences ship, which together with Four Seasons Hotels and Resorts was planning to build and operate a unique ultra luxurious fully private residence ship - scheduled to circumnavigate the globe. The Ocean Residences ship would be the second residential ship in the world following the introduction of The World, which initially was planned as a combined cruise and residential ship but later converted to become fully residential as well through the acquisition by its resident owners in 2003. In May 2020 Mr. Stensby launched the Superyacht Njord, a private super yacht with a philanthropic purpose, is the successor to The World of Residensea and is equipped to undertake scientific and oceanographic research everywhere she travels. Superyacht Njord will be home to a discerning community of 117 individual families from around the world, sharing a passion for travel, adventure and discovery. Every dimension and each detail of Superyacht Njord is meticulously crafted by icons of the design world, including renowned superyacht architect Espen Øino who also designed REV Ocean. Superyacht Njord is home-from-home living and one of the most exclusive clubs in the world.

References

External links
Ocean Residences website
Superyacht NJORD website

Living people
American people of Norwegian descent
University of Denver alumni
San Francisco State University alumni
University of Oslo alumni
Year of birth missing (living people)